Blue in the Face is the second and final doubleDrive album, released in 2003. It sold 27,000 units in the US according to Soundscan. The album reached No. 43 on Top Heatseekers, and the single taken from the album, entitled "Imprint" reached No. 22 on Hot Mainstream Rock Tracks on Billboard charts.

Track listing
"11:59"
"Imprint"
"Hollowbody"
"Million People"
"I Don't Care"
"Freightrain"
"Track Number 7"
"Evenout"
"Inside Out"
"The Hand"
"Big Shove"

All songs written by Mike Froedge, Donnie Hamby, Troy McLawhorn and Joshua Sattler from doubleDrive except for "Imprint" which was co-written with Ryan Williams (and features lyrics co-written by Dick Sheetz) .

References

DoubleDrive albums
2003 albums
Roadrunner Records albums